Glenville Adam James Le Fondre (born 2 December 1986), known as Adam Le Fondre, is an English professional footballer who plays as a striker for Sydney FC in the A-League.

He previously played for his hometown club Stockport County as well as Rochdale, Rotherham United, and Reading. He is also known by the nicknames ALF or, subsequently, Alfie, derived from his initials.

As of 2021, Le Fondre owns the fourth-best career minutes-per-goal ratio in Premier League history, at 124.4. He netted 12 times in his only season in the top flight in 2012–13.

Career

Stockport County
Born in Stockport, Greater Manchester, Le Fondre began his career at Stockport County, where he progressed through the club's Centre of Excellence youth system. He made his debut against Bury in 2004, scoring the third goal in a 3–1 victory.

Rochdale

Le Fondre joined Rochdale on loan from Stockport during the 2007 January transfer window, scoring twice on his debut in the 5–0 defeat of MK Dons. Earlier that term, he scored four goals in one game for County as they thrashed Wrexham 5–2.

Having impressed everyone at the club during his loan spell, manager Keith Hill made Le Fondre's move permanent in the summer, and on 2 July 2007, Rochdale agreed an undisclosed fee for Le Fondre with Stockport, and signed a three-year deal the day after.

He featured in every game as the side made it all the way to the Wembley Play Off Final at the end of a season where he was the club's leading marksman. He continued his form into the 2008–09 season and finished the season as leading scorer with 21 goals and a series of Player of the Season awards.

Rotherham United

2009–10 season
On 8 August 2009, Rotherham United agreed a fee with Rochdale for the striker, but the deal was thought to have fallen through due to Le Fondre wanting a longer contract. However, on 11 August, Le Fondre signed for the club on a three-year contract for an undisclosed fee.

Le Fondre made his first start in a 2–1 victory at Grimsby Town in August, opening the scoring from the penalty spot. He scored again on his home debut, which came against former club Rochdale. His workrate and obvious talent endeared him to the Rotherham faithful and he quickly became a huge fans favourite. Le Fondre was nominated for the League Two Player of the Month award four times throughout the course of the 2009/10 season (August, September, November and February) though he failed to win the award and, was named in the PFA League Two Team of the Year, alongside fellow Rotherham players Ian Sharps and Nicky Law Jnr, as Rotherham finished fifth in Football League Two and qualified for the playoffs. Le Fondre scored once in each leg of the semi-finals against Aldershot Town as Rotherham ran out 3–0 winners on aggregate, before they lost 3–2 in the final against Dagenham & Redbridge. Le Fondre finished the season with 30 goals and was linked with moves to Championship clubs Derby County and Leicester City, though Rotherham denied a deal had been agreed with either club.

2010–11 season
He scored four in one game for the second time in his career on 21 August 2010 in a remarkable 6–4 home victory over Cheltenham Town in the league. Huddersfield Town had a bid rejected for Le Fondre in January 2011. Le Fondre scored his 50th goal for the Millers in just 87 games with the second goal in a 2–0 win against Accrington Stanley on 15 February 2011. Le Fondre revealed in May 2011 that although he was happy to stay with Rotherham he revealed he was looking to sign for a club at a higher level.

Reading

2011–12 season
On 27 August 2011, Le Fondre signed a three-year contract with Championship side Reading for a fee believed to be around £350,000. He scored his first goal for Reading in a 2–0 win against Doncaster Rovers on 17 September 2011 with a header from a Joseph Mills cross. His second goal for the club came in a 3–2 win away to Bristol City. He scored his first brace for Reading against Derby County on 18 October 2011 with a volley and then a close-range header from a Hal Robson-Kanu cross. His next goal came on 29 November against Peterborough in a 3–2 win. He ended a run of seven games without a goal when he scored the winning goal in a 2–1 win away to Watford on 14 January 2012 with a flick with his back to goal. On 3 March he came off the bench to score the winning goal against Millwall, giving Reading their sixth successive win. On 6 April, he scored a late brace as Reading beat Leeds United 2–0, sending Reading to the top of the Championship table in the process. On 13 April he scored twice as Reading beat promotion rivals Southampton 3–1, significantly boosting Reading's chances of promotion back to the Premier League. This also increased their title hopes by pushing a 3-point margin with 3 games to go. On 21 April, he came off the bench to score in a 2–2 draw against Crystal Palace, with the point helping to secure the Championship title.

2012–13 season
On 18 August 2012, he scored on his Premier League debut during a 1–1 home draw with Stoke City at the Madejski Stadium, scoring a 90th-minute penalty to rescue a point for Reading. On 17 November 2012 he helped Reading to their first Premier League win of the season, netting both goals in a 2–1 victory over Everton. Le Fondre's next goal came in a 4–3 home defeat against his boyhood club Manchester United, after he headed home from a corner to make it 2–2. Le Fondre also scored against Arsenal on 17 December, but Reading were defeated 5–2 and remained at the foot of the Premier League table. He scored twice in a 3–1 win at Crawley Town in the FA Cup on 5 January 2013, and followed it up a week later, scoring a penalty in a 3–2 win over West Bromwich Albion, having been 2–0 down earlier in the game. Le Fondre's good form continued when he notched two goals against Newcastle United after coming off the bench on 19 January 2013 in a match that brought Reading their first away win of the season. He proceeded to single-handedly bring Reading back from 2–0 down to draw with Chelsea on 30 January, scoring two late goals, earning Reading a much needed point in their race against the drop. Le Fondre's five goals in January helped him to his and Reading's first ever Premier League Player of the Month award.
Le Fondre ended a goal drought by coming off the bench to round Mark Schwarzer and slot home the third goal in Reading's 4–2 away win at Fulham. This also meant Le Fondre clinched the record for most Premier League goals in a season as a substitute. On 14 May, he was named Reading F.C. Player of the Season. He also scored in Reading's 4–2 defeat at West Ham United on the final day of the season, when he turned in Nick Blackman's cross to equalise after coming off the bench at half time. This meant Le Fondre ended the season with 14 goals, including 12 in the Premier League.

2013–14 season
On 3 August 2013, Le Fondre scored on the opening day of the season at home to Ipswich Town which ended 2–1 win. Le Fondre scored back-to-back home hat-tricks against Bolton Wanderers and Blackpool on 18 and 28 January respectively. He finished the season with 15 goals from 38 league games. In total, Le Fondre scored 42 goals in 110 appearances in all competitions for Reading.

Cardiff City

Le Fondre signed a three-year contract with Cardiff City on 28 May 2014 for an undisclosed fee. Le Fondre made his Cardiff City debut against Blackburn Rovers in a 1–1 draw in the opening match of the 2014–15 Championship season on 8 August 2014. He scored his first goal for Cardiff on 21 October 2014, in a 3–1 home win over Ipswich Town.

Bolton Wanderers (loan)
On 26 January 2015, Le Fondre joined Bolton Wanderers on loan for the remainder of the 2014–15 Championship season. His first goal for Bolton came in a 3–1 win against Fulham at the Macron Stadium after the keeper came out and left himself stranded after kicking his clearance straight at Le Fondre who lobbed the ball back into the net from 30 yards. Le Fondre made it 5 goals in his first 10 games for Bolton with a well taken brace in Bolton's 2–0 home win over Millwall on 14 March 2015. He finished the season as Bolton's highest scorer with eight goals.

Wolverhampton Wanderers (loan)
On 3 August 2015, Le Fondre joined Wolverhampton Wanderers on a season-long loan. On 29 August 2015, Le Fondre scored his first goal for Wolves with a late winner in a 2–1 home win over Charlton after coming off the bench. Le Fondre made 26 appearances for Wolves, 16 as a substitute, scoring 3 goals.

2016–17 season
During the pre-season, Le Fondre was told he was free to find another club by new boss, Paul Trollope, and trained with the under-21 development squad. As Cardiff found themselves short on strikers and only scoring 4 in the opening 6 games of the season, he returned to the 18 man squad against Reading, but remained on the bench.

On 31 August 2016, Le Fondre joined Wigan Athletic on a season long loan for the 2016–17 season.

On 27 September 2016, Le Fondre made his Wigan debut as a starter against his old team Wolves. He made an immediate impact by scoring his first goal for Wigan after just 5 minutes in a 2–1 home victory.

On 31 January 2017, Le Fondre's loan deal at Wigan was terminated to allow him to rejoin League One side Bolton Wanderers on loan until the end of the 2016–17 season.

Bolton Wanderers
On 6 June 2017, Bolton Wanderers confirmed that Le Fondre had joined them on a two-year contract with the option of an extension.

Sydney FC
On 17 August 2018, Le Fondre joined A-League side Sydney FC after mutually terminating his contract with Bolton three days earlier. During the 2018–19 A-League season, he was part of the squad that defeated Perth Glory in the 2019 A-League Grand Final and finished the season as the second highest scorer in the league 

On 23 April 2021, Le Fondre signed a new two-and-a-half year contract with Sydney.

2020–21 season: Loan to Mumbai City
On 7 October 2020, Le Fondre joined Mumbai City on loan for the 2020–21 Indian Super League season. He made his debut for the club in a 1–0 defeat to NorthEast United on 21 November 2020. He scored his first goal for Mumbai City in the club's next league match against Goa, converting a penalty in the fifth minute of stoppage time to secure a 1–0 victory. He has played a very vital role for Mumbai City FC in winning the League Winners Shield. He has scored 11 goals in 20 games and gave 1 Assist and also contributed in defence with 24 tackles and had 495 touches  and led the attack with 41 shots in just 20 games. He had a memorable ISL season  and finished as the fourth highest goal scorer. He helped Mumbai win the double, as they won both the League Winners Shield and the Play-offs.

Personal life
He is a lifelong Manchester United fan and he cites his heroes as Eric Cantona and Ole Gunnar Solskjær. His second cousin Kian plays for the Burnley Academy having originally been in the Bolton Wanderers Academy.

Career statistics

Honours
Reading
Football League Championship: 2011–12

Bolton Wanderers
EFL League One runner-up: 2016–17

Sydney FC
 A-League Championship: 2018–19, 2019–20
 A-League Premiership: 2019–20

Mumbai City FC
 Indian Super League: 2020–21
Indian Super League League Winners Shield: 2020–21

Individual
PFA Team of the Year: 2009–10 League Two
Premier League Player of the Month:  January 2013
Reading Player of the Season: 2012–13
A-League Team of the Season: 2018–19, 2019–20

References

External links

1986 births
Living people
Footballers from Stockport
English footballers
Association football forwards
Stockport County F.C. players
Rochdale A.F.C. players
Rotherham United F.C. players
Reading F.C. players
Cardiff City F.C. players
Bolton Wanderers F.C. players
Wolverhampton Wanderers F.C. players
Wigan Athletic F.C. players
Sydney FC players
Mumbai City FC players
Premier League players
English Football League players
Marquee players (A-League Men)
Indian Super League players
English people of French descent